Sadun is a given name and surname. Notable people with the name include:

Given name
 Sadun Aren (1922–2008), Turkish academic and politician
 Sadun Boro (1928–2015), first Turkish sailor to circumnavigate the globe
 Sa'dun Hammadi (1930–2007), Prime Minister of Iraq in 1991

Surname
 Abd Al-Baqi Abd Karim Al-Sadun (1947–2021), Iraqi politician
 Alfredo Sadun (born 1950), American academic
 Elvio Sadun (1918–1974), Italian-American parasitologist

Turkish masculine given names